John Ward Westcott  (December 19, 1848 – August 17, 1913) was an American ship captain on the Great Lakes in the late nineteenth and early twentieth century. He is noted for making and developing the first floating range lights and the first lightship for safe navigation in Lake St. Clair at the Detroit River. He was the youngest ship captain on the Great lakes.

Westcott was a representative for steamship lines and developed a message delivery system between moving Great Lakes freighters on the Detroit River at the Michigan-Canadian border. That ultimately led to the only floating United States post office, and enabled United States Mail delivery to river vehicles 'on the fly' by addressing to the boat's name and the only floating postal zip code of 48222. The key technique was to row a small boat next to a large ship and transfer pieces of paper through a pail hoisted between the vessels. This technique advanced to a powered tugboat moving at the same speed as the large ship and more mail could then be transferred between them. This developed out further in the twenty-first century by specially designed supply boats to be able to transfer not only mail, but packages and supplies between the moving vessels.

Early life and education 

Westcott was born in the village of Warnersville on Lime Island, Michigan, on December 19, 1848. He was the son of shipbuilder David H. Westcott and his wife Mary Jane (Ward) Westcott, sister to Captain Eber Brock Ward. His father was 25 and his mother was 22 at the time of his birth. He had four brothers George, Edward, Charles, and David and two sisters Mary Jane and Susie who lived to maturity. The family moved shortly after his birth from Lime Island to the village of Newport, near Detroit, Michigan.

Westcott went to public schools and received a grade school education. In his preteen days he worked in his father's boat yard.  At the age of 13, he became a cabin boy on the ship SS Forester. From this job he learned the operations of a ship steamer and worked his way up the various ship's duties as deckhand, steward, wheelsman, and mate. Westcott ultimately became a ship captain in 1868 at the age of twenty. When he received this promotion he was the youngest captain on the Great Lakes. He then sailed in ships his father built, the St. Paul, the Keweenaw, the Mineral Rock and the Phil Sheridan.

Career
Westcott was master of steamers until 1873 when he established the first range lights at Grosse Pointe, Michigan. He also developed the first lightship on Lake St. Clair in Michigan by buying an old flat-bottomed boat and put a light on it as a guiding light for ships on the lake. These boats then were range indicators on Windmill Point as a guiding light to help ships avoid going aground at Belle Isle and Peche Island, a Canadian island in the Detroit River.

Wescott in the 1870s was working in Detroit as an agent representative for Pittsburgh shipping of Pickands Mather Company and other steamship lines. He established a marine reporting firm in 1874. He saw a need for reporting information about ship orders to captains navigating the Detroit River. He also passed messages back and forth to crew members and their families and friends. He would meet large vessels in the Detroit River with his row boat to relay messages written on paper. He charged 25 cents per item, a substantially higher fee than the post office was charging for a piece of mail. People did not mind paying this amount, as it was a needed service that the United States post office was not providing. In addition to communications, the service provided shipping trade information and national and international news. Westcott's service developed into a mail-in-the-pail technique first done in the Detroit River on June 17, 1895.

The following procedure saw a man in a rowboat towed out by the Florence B. power boat to meet an oncoming freighter traveling down the Detroit River. This man then threw a line up to a sailor on the large vessel, who would catch it and secure it to the deck. The man in the rowboat would wait until the slack played out and the tight rope then pulled the rowboat in tow at the same speed as the freighter. The mail was transferred between the vessels by a pail on a rope that was lowered from the large ship to Westcott's rowboat. It was then pulled up back up onto the large ship after the mail was exchanged in the pail. After that the rowboat was released from the towing line of the large freighter, it was subsequently rowed to the next oncoming freighter to do the same procedure. After all the Detroit River traveling freighters with mail were served, the man in the rowboat went back to the Detroit port where he started from earlier in the day.

This was a type of marine mail service to and from moving vessels of through traffic that did not stop at a Detroit port. The private enterprise started with 47,000 pieces of mail in its first year of operation. It ultimately led to Westcott's vessel becoming an official United States Postal Service-contracted mail-boat in 1948 as a privately owned floating post office, and by 1972 was accounting for more than 700,000 pieces of mail being handled per year. Wescott's service meant that ships did not have to stop and go ashore to collect their mail and could get it 'on the fly' while still moving midstream in the Detroit River.

Wescott added a power boat in 1908 to meet these larger moving vessels – the SS J.W. Wescott No. 1. A second boat, the 45 foot (14 m) craft J. W. Westcott II, was introduced to the floating mail service in 1955. It was renewed on a United States Postal Service contract in 1974  and the work was done by non-postal employees of the Wescott Company around the clock seven days a week. It led to the only floating post office associated with a United States zip code designation  – 48222, the Detroit River Post Office. By 1999 the J.W. Wescott II mailboat had expanded its service to delivering packages, newspapers, groceries, and supplies in addition to its million pieces of mail annually.

The larger vessels and freighters traveling down the Detroit River do not stop in general, but are just through traffic to other destinations. Those that want to communicate with the Great Lake freighters send their mail in care of the ship's name at zip code 48222 and it is forwarded accordingly 'on the fly' by the Westcott Company while the mailboat and the main vessel are still moving. As of 2017, the company currently receives about a third of its income from the post office, and the remainder is split between other contracts and fares for passenger transport. The company's reserve craft is the Joseph J. Hogan.

Personal life 

Westcott married in Detroit to Henrietta Eagles Crane of Newark, New Jersey, on December 29, 1878. They had four children: Mary, Henrietta, John Westcott II, and Charles, all born in Detroit. Wescott was an alderman in the fourth Ward in Detroit from 1884 to 1885 and an associated with the Episcopalian church. He was a member of several clubs including the Fellowcraft Club, the Wolverine Automobile Club, the Detroit Lodge No. 7, and the Ship-masters Association. In his activities as a ship captain he received several medals for rescuing drowning people. Westcott died at his sister's home in Ann Arbor, Michigan, on August 17, 1913, at the age of 64.

Wescott's marine mail system

References

Sources

External links 

Mail Boat Stays Afloat
J.W. Westcott Company Timeline
J.W. Westcott II floating post office

1848 births
1913 deaths
Businesspeople from Michigan
19th-century American businesspeople